Marjorie Berman Lees was an American neuroscientist who was emeritus professor of biological chemistry at Harvard Medical School. Her research considered neurobiology and biochemistry. She was the first to identify the Folch-Lees proteolipid. She served as president of the American Society for Neurochemistry in 1983.

Early life and education 
Lees was born in New York City and was educated in the New York Public School System. She attended Hunter High School, where she credited her physics and chemistry teacher with her enthusiasm for science. She was an undergraduate student at Hunter College, where she was introduced to neuroscience and the nervous system of the Xenopus. She enrolled in a master's course at the University of Chicago, where she investigated the brains of fish. She was particularly interested in the regions that gave rise to their light-seeking behavior. She obtained her master's towards the end of World War II, and met a soldier returning from war who later became her husband. She joined the group of David Nachmansohn, where she worked on choline acetyltransferase and identified the presence of Coenzyme A, a small, heat-stable organic molecule. Her husband was admitted to an aeronautical engineering graduate program at Massachusetts Institute of Technology, and Lees eventually joined the lab of Jordi Folch Pi at Harvard Medical School. She secured funding from the National Institutes of Health and investigated sulfatides. During her doctoral research, Lees identified that it was possible to extract sulfatide using chloroform. and that extracts of sulfatide including a protein. She measured the amount of this protein by determining the amount of ammonia using Van Slyke determination. The protein later became known as the Folch-Lees proteolipid.

Research and career 
Lees started her independent academic career at the Geisel School of Medicine (then Dartmouth Medical College), where she continued to study lipid isolation and to develop quantitative extraction strategies. She eventually returned to Harvard Medical School, where she established a laboratory at the Eunice Kennedy Shriver National Institute of Child Health and Human Development. She was made Director of the Department.

Proteolipids, such as the Folch-Lees proteolipid identified by Lees, are critical constituents of cell membranes. They are generally involved with ion channel activity and cellular processes. Lees analyzed the conditions for the electrophoretic analysis of the Folch-Lees proteolipid and developed a strategy to isolate the Folch-Lees proteolipid. She used antibodies raised against Folch-Lees proteolipid to study the membrane topology of Folch-Lees proteolipids.

Alongside her work on proteolipids, Lees studied myelin, the fatty substance that surrounds the axons of nerves. She argued that dynamic interactions within myelin were responsible for its function. She studied myelin proteins, and identified Na⁺/K⁺-ATPase as a myelin protein.

Academic service 
At Harvard Medical School, Lees developed courses on the biochemistry and neurobiology of mental retardation. Alongside her scientific research, Lees was committed to improving the recognition and representation of women in neurochemistry. Lees was the first woman to be made president of the American Society for Neurochemistry, in 1983.

Selected publications

Personal life 
Lees had three children. She died in 2012 following a long illness.

References 

American neuroscientists
1923 births
2012 deaths
Hunter College alumni
Hunter College High School alumni
Scientists from New York City
Neurochemists
University of Chicago alumni
Radcliffe College alumni
Geisel School of Medicine faculty
Harvard Medical School faculty
American women neuroscientists
20th-century American scientists
20th-century American women scientists